Korovin, or Korovina (feminine; Коровина), is a Russian last name, which is derived from the Russian word korova (корова, or cow).  Notable persons with that surname include:

Hal Korovin (born 1925), American professional basketball player
Ilya Korovin (1923–1944), Soviet army officer and Hero of the Soviet Union
Konstantin Korovin (1861–1939), leading Russian Impressionist painter
Nikolai Korovin (1920–1957), Soviet aircraft pilot and Hero of the Soviet Union
Sergei Korovin (1858–1908), Russian painter and brother of Konstantin Korovin
Sergei Korovin (designer) (1884–1946), Soviet firearm designer
Yevgeny Korovin (botanist) (1891–1963), Soviet botanist and academician
Evgeny A. Korovin (1892–1964), Soviet international lawyer

See also
Korovin Island, one of the islands in the Gulf of Alaska
Korovin pistol, a Soviet pistol
Korovin Volcano, the highest point on Atka Island in the Aleutian chain

Surnames
Russian-language surnames